Ambon (formerly ) is the capital and largest city of the Indonesian province of Maluku. It covers a land area of 298.61 km2, and had a population of 331,254 at the 2010 Census and 347,288 at the 2020 Census. The city is divided into five administrative districts – namely Nusaniwe, Sirimau, Teluk Ambon (Ambon Bay), Baguala and Leitimur Selatan (South Leitimur). Known as Indonesia's music city, Ambon became the first city in Southeast Asia to be recognised as the UNESCO City of Music in 2019.

The city is populated by a mix of ethnic Alifuru (original Moluccans), Javanese, Balinese, Butonese, Bugis, Makassar, Papuan, Minahasa, Minang, Flobamora (Flores, Sumba, Alor and Timor ethnics) and those of foreign descent (Chinese, Arabian-Ambonese, Spanish-Ambonese, German-Ambonese, Portuguese-Ambonese and Dutch-Ambonese). Between 1999 and 2002, there was social unrest motivated by racial intolerance.

History

Colonial era

Ambon was colonized by Portugal in 1526 and originally named Nossa Senhora de Anunciada, founded by Portuguese-Moluccan Governor Sancho de Vasconcelos. The Portuguese were driven out by the Dutch in 1605. Except for brief periods of British rule, the island remained under Dutch control until Indonesia's independence in 1945.

During the Dutch period, Ambon was the seat of the Dutch resident and military commander of the Maluku Islands. The town was protected by Fort Victoria, and the 1911 Encyclopædia Britannica characterized it as "a clean little town with wide streets, well planted". The population was divided into two classes, orang burger (citizens) and orang negri (villagers), the former being a class of native origin enjoying certain privileges conferred on their ancestors by the old Dutch East India Company. There were also, besides the Dutch, some Arabs, Chinese and a few Portuguese settlers. Ambon was a center of Christian missionary activity, and Ambon and the surrounding islands have many Christians as well as the Muslims that predominate in most of Indonesia.

On 22 December 1902, the Apostolic Prefecture of Dutch New Guinea was established in the city, later to be promoted as the Diocese of Amboina.

Ambon Island was the site of a major Dutch naval base and was of strategic importance during WW2. In 1941, Dutch forces with the assistance of Australian forces reinforced Ambon in anticipation of a Japanese attack. Japanese forces attacked Ambon as part of their attack on the Dutch East Indies. Despite formidable defenses, Ambon fell after its defenders surrendered after four days of fighting on 3 February 1942. Following the battle, Japanese forces committed numerous acts of atrocities, including the execution of over 300 Dutch and Australian POWs at Laha airfield.

Conflicts since independence
In 1950 Ambon was the center of an uprising against Indonesian rule, caused by the self-proclaimed Republic of the South Moluccas. Indonesian troops invaded the city during the Invasion of Ambon and reasserted control in just a few months. Many important buildings such as the Victoria Fort (APRMS main base) were heavily damaged during the confrontation.

In April and May 1958 during the Permesta rebellion in North Sulawesi, the USA supported and supplied the rebels. Pilots from a Taiwan-based CIA front organisation, Civil Air Transport, flying CIA B-26 Invader aircraft, repeatedly bombed and machine-gunned targets in and around Ambon. On 27 April a CIA raid set fire to a military command post, a fuel dump and a Royal Dutch Shell complex. The attack on Shell was deliberate: the CIA had orders to hit foreign commercial interests in order to drive foreign trade away from Indonesia and undermine its economy. The next day, the same CIA pilot bombed Shell interests at Balikpapan in East Kalimantan on Borneo, which persuaded Shell to suspend tanker services from there.

On 28 April a CIA air raid damaged an Indonesian Army barracks next to a marketplace. On 30 April a CIA air raid hit the airstrip. On 7 May a CIA air raid attacked Ambon airstrip, seriously damaging a Douglas C-47 Skytrain and an Indonesian Air Force North American P-51 Mustang and setting fire to a number of fuel drums. On 8 May a CIA B-26 tried to bomb an Indonesian Navy gunboat in Ambon harbour. Its bomb missed but it then machine-gunned the boat, wounding two crew. The Indonesian National Armed Forces reinforced Ambon City's anti-aircraft defences with a number of  machine guns. On 9 May a CIA B-26 attacked the city again. The machine-gunners returned fire and an Indonesian Air Force P-51 Mustang chased the B-26, but it escaped.

On 15 May a CIA B-26 attacked a small ship, the Naiko, in Ambon Bay. The Naiko was a merchant ship that the Indonesian Government had pressed into military service, and she was bringing a company of Ambonese troops home from East Java. A CIA bomb hit the Naikos engine room, killing one crew member and 16 infantrymen and setting the ship on fire. The B-26 then attacked Ambon city, aiming for the barracks. Its first bomb missed and exploded in a market-place next door. The next landed in the barracks compound but bounced and exploded near an ice factory. The B-26 in the May air raids was flown by a CAT pilot called Allen Pope. On 18 May Pope attacked Ambon again. First he raided the airstrip again, destroying the C-47 and P-51 that he had damaged on 7 May. Then he flew west of the city and tried to attack one of a pair of troop ships being escorted by the Indonesian Navy. Indonesian forces shot down the B-26 but Pope and his Indonesian radio operator survived and were captured. Pope's capture immediately exposed the level of CIA support for the Permesta rebellion. Embarrassed, the Eisenhower administration quickly ended CIA support for Permesta and withdrew its agents and remaining aircraft from the conflict.

As part of the transmigration program in the 1980s, the Suharto government relocated many migrants, most of them Muslim, from densely overpopulated Java.

Between 1999 and 2002, Ambon was at the centre of sectarian conflict across the Maluku Islands. There was further religious violence in 2011.

Geography and climate

Topography 
Most of the land area can be classified as hilly to steeply sloping, while 17% of the land area can be classified as more flat or shallow-sloped.

Climate
Ambon experiences a tropical rainforest climate (Af) according to Köppen Climate Classification as there is no real dry season. As it is located near the equator, the temperature throughout the year is constant.

Administrative districts 

The city is divided into five districts (kecamatan), tabulated below with their areas and their 2010 Census and 2020 Census populations.

Like other regions in the (Maluku), areas in Ambon are still considered as states led by kings and queens.

Religion 
Based on the 2010 census, the city was populated by 331,254 people; in the 2020 Census, this had reached 348,288 people. In 2010, the religious breakdown in Ambon was 60.78% Christians with 58.37% being Protestants, 2.41% Catholics, 39.02% Muslims and 3% others.

Economy 
Economic growth rate of Ambon City in 2014 was 5.96%. Gross Domestic Regional Product in 2014 both at current market price and at constant market price was increasing gradually. The increase, if compared to 2013 GDRP at current market price equal to 12.76 percent and 5.96 percent for GDRP at constant market price. The GDRP at current market price in Ambon 2014 was equal to Rp.9.9 trillion, whereas for GDRP at constant 2010 market price, it was equal to Rp.7.77 trillion.

In 2014, the gross domestic product per capita of Ambon based on current prices grew by 8.3 percent, while for the constant price in Ambon City grew by 1.7 percent. GDP per capita of Ambon City in 2014 is 25.16 Million (U $1,836.43). The poverty rate in the city of Ambon is 4.42% which is the smallest percentage of poverty in the province of Maluku.

All twenty one economic sectors in 2014 saw positive growth for GDRP of Ambon. For GDRP at current market price, the highest contribution was provided by the electricity and gas Sector with 34.2 percent, while the lowest was human health and Social Work activities with 6.61 percent.

Education
The literacy rate was 99.63% in 2010. However, the school enrollment rate in Ambon City was only 73% in 2010, whereas the national average was 96%. In 201. The enrollment rates in Ambon City were 98.72% in the primary education level, 95% in junior high, 78% in high school, and 45% in college or university.

Currently, the city has 17 higher education institutions. These are:
 State Owned Institutions  
 Pattimura University
 Ambon State Polytechnic 
 Private Institutions
     College of Protestant Christianity Ambon
     Trinity College of Administrative Sciences
     Abdul Aziz Kataloka College of Administrative Sciences   
     Rutu Nusa College of Economics Management 
     Pasapua College of Health 
     University of Darussalam Ambon
     Christian University of Indonesia Maluku
     Maritime Academy Maluku
     Caritas Secretary and Management Academy 
     Ambon College of Computer Sciences 
     Indonesian Islamic Religion Institute Ambon
     Industrial Academy ( AKPER RUKMIT ) Ambon
     Evangelical Theology College Indonesia 
     Bethel Theology College Ambon
     St. Yohanes College Ambon

Places of interest

 Merah Putih Bridge
 Monument of Pattimura, Lapangan Merdeka
 Monument of Christina Martha Tiahahu, Karang Panjang
 Pattimura Stadium
 Ambon Plaza
 Liang beach
 Natsepa beach
 Santai Beach Resort
 Pintu Kota beach
 Galala-Poka Ferry crossing
 Batu Merah
 Ambon Bay at sunset
 Museum Siwalima at Batu Capeu
 Pukul Sapu Dance at Morela and Mamala (after seven days of Muslim's Eid al-Fitri)
Siwang Paradise

Transportation
Ambon is served by Pattimura International Airport.

Twin towns – sister cities

Ambon is twinned with:

  Vlissingen, Netherlands
  Darwin, Northern Territory, Australia
  Dili, Timor Leste
  Selayang, Malaysia
   George Town, Malaysia

References

Sources

External links

 Human Rights Watch report on the conflict

 
Populated places in Maluku (province)
Provincial capitals in Indonesia
1526 establishments in the Portuguese Empire
Populated places established in 1526